Bleuphoria is the sixth studio album by American singer Rahsaan Patterson. It was released on July 19, 2011 on Artistry Music. Production for Bleuphoria was handled primarily by Patterson and long-time collaborators Jamey Jaz and Keith Crouch. The album features geust vocals by singers Jody Watley, Shanice Wilson, Faith Evans and Lalah Hathaway, as well as a cover version of "I Only Have Eyes for You." The singles "Easier Said Than Done" and "6 AM" were released to radio and made available on iTunes.

Critical reception

AllMusic editor Andy Kellman called Bleuphoria Patterson's "boldest and most scattered album to date." He found that "it sounds as if Patterson has never had more fun making music, indulging in his whims." L. Michael Gipson, writing for SoulTracks, felt that "overall, the ocean of his utopic vision works, though there are moments of murkiness and the waters aren’t always as deep as the myopic drawer of our bath may believe."

Track listing

Charts

Release history

References

External links
 Official website

2011 albums
Rahsaan Patterson albums